Bakov is a Russian masculine surname, its feminine counterpart is Bakova. It may refer to
Anka Bakova (born 1957), Bulgarian rower 
Anton Bakov (born 1965), Russian politician and monarchist
Rustam Bakov (born 1983), Russian football midfielder

See also
Bakov nad Jizerou, a town in Czech Republic

Russian-language surnames